NexTraq is a fleet tracking company based in Atlanta, Georgia, United States. Acquired by Francisco Partners in 2009, NexTraq is a provider of Global Positioning System vehicle management and fleet tracking solutions. The NexTraq Fleet Tracking platform (formerly MARCUS ) is a cloud-based application for service and distribution businesses to optimize fleet operations. The suite of applications—Fleet Dispatch, Fleet Metrics and Fleet Mobile—gives customers the ability to manage their fleet more efficiently. Reporting functionality delivers key performance indicators (KPIs).

On Oct 30, 2013, NexTraq was acquired by FleetCor Technologies, Inc.

On June 14, 2017, it was announced that Michelin acquired the company.

References

External links
 Official website

Companies based in Atlanta